1851 Lacroute, provisional designation , is an asteroid from the outer region of the asteroid belt, approximately 17 kilometers in diameter.

It was discovered on 9 November 1950, by French astronomer Louis Boyer at the Algiers Observatory in the capital of Algeria, Northern Africa, and named after French astronomer Pierre Lacroute.

Orbit and classification 

Lacroute orbits the Sun in the outer main-belt at a distance of 2.5–3.7 AU once every 5 years and 6 months (1,996 days). Its orbit has an eccentricity of 0.19 and an inclination of 2° with respect to the ecliptic. As no precoveries were taken, and no prior identifications were made, the body's observation arc begins with its official discovery observation in 1950.

Physical characteristics 

According to the surveys carried out by the Infrared Astronomical Satellite (IRAS) and NASA's Wide-field Infrared Survey Explorer with its subsequent NEOWISE mission, Lacroute measures 16.9 and 18.2 kilometers in diameter, and its surface has an albedo of 0.049 and 0.074, respectively. As of 2016, the body's spectral type, as well as its rotation period and shape remain unknown.

Naming 

This minor planet was named in honor of French astronomer Pierre Lacroute (1906–1993), a known astrometrist, president of IAU's Commission 24 in the 1970s, and director of the Observatory of Strasbourg, instrumental in the establishment of the Stellar Data Center (also see SIMBAD).

Lacroute also made an independent reduction of the astrometric star catalogue AGK3, using a technique involving overlapping photographic plates. The official  was published by the Minor Planet Center on 1 August 1978.

References

External links 
 Asteroid Lightcurve Database (LCDB), query form (info )
 Dictionary of Minor Planet Names, Google books
 Asteroids and comets rotation curves, CdR – Observatoire de Genève, Raoul Behrend
 Discovery Circumstances: Numbered Minor Planets (1)-(5000) – Minor Planet Center
 
 

001851
Discoveries by Louis Boyer (astronomer)
Named minor planets
19501109